The  National Assembly for Wales (Representation of the People) Order 2007  amends the National Assembly for Wales (Representation of the People) Order which made provision for the conduct of elections and the return of members to the National Assembly for Wales.

Changes

To the interpretation article and article 5 so that the references are updated to those in the Government of Wales Act 2006 or to the amendments to the Representation of the People Act 1983 effected by the Electoral Administration Act 2006.
To the requirement in article 39 that the office of the election agent for a regional election need no longer be located in the Assembly electoral region for which the person is the agent but can be located anywhere in Wales.
To article 114 and 133 to reflect changes made by the Legal Services Act 2007
To Schedule 1 to correct references to articles in the paragraphs of that schedule.
To forms in the Appendix of Forms to correct errors or omissions and, in respect of the constituency and regional ballot papers, to update the format of those papers to assist voters.

No impact assessment was carried out for this instrument as it has no significant impact on the costs of business, charities, voluntary bodies or the public sector.

See also
National Assembly for Wales

References

External links
 Official National Assembly for Wales site

Welsh laws
Electoral reform in Wales
Statutory Instruments of the United Kingdom
2007 in British law
2007 in Wales
Election law in the United Kingdom